Piz Bever is a mountain of the Albula Alps, located in the Val Bever, in the canton of Graubünden.

References

External links
 Piz Bever on Hikr

Mountains of the Alps
Alpine three-thousanders
Mountains of Switzerland
Mountains of Graubünden
Bever, Switzerland
Samedan